Dmytro Viktorovych Penteleychuk (born 9 August 2000) is a Ukrainian professional footballer who plays as a left midfielder for Mariupol.

Career
Penteleychuk is a product of the Bukovyna and UFK Lviv youth sportive schools.

He played for Veres and Lviv in the Ukrainian Premier League Reserves and in January 2019 Penteleychuk was promoted to the senior squad of the last team. He made his debut in the Ukrainian Premier League for Lviv on 22 May 2019, playing in a draw match against FC Zorya Luhansk.

References

External links 
 
 

2000 births
Living people
Sportspeople from Chernivtsi
Ukrainian footballers
Association football midfielders
NK Veres Rivne players
FC Lviv players
FC Vovchansk players
FC Yarud Mariupol players
Ukrainian Premier League players
Ukrainian First League players
Ukrainian Second League players